Fyodor Alekseyevich Minin (ca. 1709 - after 1742) was a Russian Arctic explorer.

In 1730s, Minin participated in the Second Kamchatka expedition. In 1736, he joined the unit led by Dmitry Ovtsyn. In 1738, he was in charge of a group of explorers, that would chart the Arctic Ocean coastline east of the Yenisei river. In 1738–1740, Minin made an attempt to go around the Taimyr Peninsula from the north and reached 75°15'N. Together with Dmitry Sterlegov, he mapped this part of the Arctic Ocean coastline.

A cape at the Mammoth Peninsula, a peninsula, the Minina Skerries in the Kara Sea, a gulf, and a mountain on the shores of the Taimyr Peninsula bear Minin's name.

References
Minin's biography

Russian and Soviet polar explorers
Explorers from the Russian Empire
Explorers of the Arctic
Kara Sea
18th-century people from the Russian Empire
Great Northern Expedition